The Lheidli T'enneh Band also known as the Lheidli T'enneh First Nation and historically known as the Fort George Indian Band  is the First Nations band government for the Lheidli T'enneh, a subgroup of the Dakelh people whose traditional territory includes the City of Prince George, British Columbia. The name means "The People from the confluence of the two rivers" in the Carrier language referring to how the Nechako River enters the Fraser River at Prince George. 

The Lheidli T'enneh are Carrier people. Their traditional language, now spoken only by a few people, is a dialect of the Carrier language. The Lheidli T'enneh did not have permanent settlements in what is modern day Prince George until the arrival of the HBC post Fort George. Temporary and seasonal settlements were used across the traditional territory and archeological evidence of fishing camps along the Nechako and Fraser rivers as well as the Beaverly area.

19th and 20th centuries

HBC Trading Post 
The Northwest Company established a trading post near the confluence of the Nechako and Fraser rivers in the early 1820s, the Northwest Company and Husdon's Bay Company merged in 1821. First Nations in the area were expected to bring furs to the post in exchange for goods. This original post was closed in 1824 but rebuilt in 1829 further down the Fraser river. The HBC Fort George Trading post was part of a series of HBC posts in the north. 

First Nations who traded with the HBC post soon developed a permanent settlement close to Fort George trading post along the Fraser river towards the confluence. In 1839 a census of the Lheidli village recorded 75 men, 50 women and 62 children for a total of 187. in 1883 the Fort George Indian Reserve was established, the footprint of which would later become the land wanted and acquired by the Grand Trunk pacific Railway to build its Prince George townsite. The Fort George Reserve No.1 encompassed 1366 acres. Three other reserve sites were also surveyed around the region. The land was considered to be agriculturally worthless and remote enough to not interfere the development. Census in the 1890's there were 29 houses with 124 residents in the village. People living in the village relied on hunting, fishing, and trapping and had also cultivated garden patches as trade with the HBC post diminished. 

Roman Catholic priests an Oblate missionaries from other posts in the region visited the Lheidli T'enneh often.

Acquisition of Reserve No.1 by the Railway 
In 1908, the Grand Trunk Pacific Railway identified the Reserve No.1 land as an ideal area for a railway and station site, and attempted to claim all the 1366 acres as needed for railway purposes, and thus circumvent negotiations with the Department of Indian Affairs. This was rejected. The Department of Indian Affairs wished to protect the Lheidli T'enneh's interests but also supported railway development. By 1910 the DIA agent in the area was concerned about the influence of white settlers on the Lheidli T'enneh, including the supply of liquor to the village and that "civilization has overtaken them too rapidly" DIA Indian Agent John McDougall however saw that the Lheidli T'enneh had come to see the value of the land and employed that in negotiations. 

Between 1908 to 1911 several offers for the acquisition of the Reserve No.1 lands were made by the GTP and others such as Charles Millar (of BC Express) who wanted to develop the land. The Department of Indian Affairs in conjunction with railroad representatives made several offers for the land. In 1910 Chief Louis described the attachment to the land and village to McDougall, who reported that "Land, Cash, and farm equipment" would be needed to overcome resistance, and the band was considered to be averse to a sale. McDougall met with Chief Louis again in December of 1910 offering $68,300 ($50/acre) but Chief Louis told McDougall that "they could not in their present mind surrender this reserve". A vote was held at a meeting two days later with members of the Band over age 21. the vote approved the surrender of the reserve land 12-11, but Chief Louis asked to talk with his people and the Band did not consider the vote final. The Band appointed Oblate Missionary E.C Bellot as an emissary to Ottawa with a larger cash demand of $1000 per acre, which was refused by DIA representatives. Upon return to Fort George, a new vote by the Band unanimously turned down the sale. During this time, the business developers of Fort George Townsite opposed the sale of the reserve lands as it would lead to its rival building a competing town while South Fort George, which was built close to the old HBC Post and the village, welcomed the railway and its townsite.  

In 1911, federal Indian agent W.J. MacAllan took on the negotiations with assistance from Reverend Father Coccola. Father Coccola conflicted role as he had interests in the well being of the Lheidli T'enneh but was also negotiating on behalf of the railway company which might connect to his mission on Stuart Lake. Father Coccola had wanted to relocated the Lheidli T'enneh to a safer area where they would be away from settlers and could be schooled in agriculture and in religion. Coccola suggested to the band that "if it tolerated intoxicating liquor and moral disorders, he would be the first to insist to have them removed". Coccola made several statements that he would convince or persuade the Band to relocate if they refused offers, and even involved himself in pricing amounts that could be offers to the Lheidli T'enneh. With several offers and refusals, the Lheidli T'enneh saw a split in support for a land sale. Chief Louis favored the surrender of the land, but Joseph Quah, an influential leader in the Band, wanted a higher price.  

On 18 November 1911, The Fort George Indian Band eventually agreed to sell the Reserve No.1 lands for $125,000 (one quarter to be paid immediately) which included $25,000 for construction on reserve No.2 and No.3 and the preservation of the original village cemetery. The band committed to relocate by June 1912. The vote for this agreement saw 32 in favor and one against, and three abstentions. The timeline was difficult to keep as new buildings had to be constructed. Delays in contracts being awarded by the government to build a new village meant that few could move by the deadline and Band members planted crops needed later in the year. The June 1912 payment was withheld as the DIA saw the planting as refusal to leave. Chief Louis argued that the agreement stated that the payment was to be made in June and was not contingent on relocation. Winter was also coming and the crops would be needed if the new village was not built or supplies given to the Band.  

The new village was completed in 1913 with Band members moving there in September. The old village was destroyed "to force the Indians away" and ensure that it was not reoccupied. The Fort George Herald reported the destruction of the old village as "the torch of the white man will be thrust into the remaining houses and the village will disappear quietly in a cloud of smoke". Indian Agent W. J. MacAllan's accounts of the situation reveal a need on his part and the part of the GTP to strong arm the bandmembers out, targeting two cabins in the village that were empty as the residents were away hinting "I knew that to set fire to the cabins would cause a flare up of intense excitement and give me the break I needed, for a crisis had to be created before the deadlock could be broken".  

The site of Reserve No.2 (Shelley) was much further away from the new Prince George townsite and other communities. The land was not particularly fertile for agriculture and the Band suffered economically. The site of the old village and the HBC post would become Fort George Park. The Cemetery would become Reserve No.1A.

21st century
There are approximately 400 members of the Lheidli T'enneh First Nation. Many also live off the reserve.

The Lheidli T'enneh Treaty 
On October 29, 2006 the Lheidli T'enneh became the first people to initiate a treaty with British Columbia and Canada within the framework of the British Columbia Treaty Process created in response to the Delgamuukw case. It remains for the treaty to be ratified by a vote of Lheidli T'enneh band members, by the Legislative Assembly of British Columbia, and by the Canadian Parliament.

On February 9, 2007 the Treaty 8 First Nations launched a legal challenge of the ratification of Lheidli T'enneh treaty.  The Treaty 8 First Nations asserted that Canada, British Columbia and the Lheidli T'enneh did not adequately consult them about the overlap of the Lheidli T'enneh treaty area and the area of Treaty 8.

The Treaty 8 First Nations sought an interlocutory injunction preventing the ratification of the treaty until such time as the parties resolves the issues of the overlap.  Justice Wilson of the Supreme Court of British Columbia denied the plaintiff's application for an interlocutory injunction.

A similar challenge was launched by the Secwepemc Nation on March 12, 2007.

The Lheidli T'enneh band members did not ratify the treaty in a treaty ratification vote held on March 30, 2007.  In the vote 123 people voted against the treaty and 111 voted in favour of it.

In response to this outcome, the British Columbia Treaty Commission undertook a "Lheidli T’enneh Communications Probe" to determine why the treaty was not ratified. This included a survey carried out by the Mustel Group, a marketing and public opinion research firm based in Vancouver.

The Lheidli T'enneh nation is currently preparing for another ratification vote.

Canada Winter Games 
The City of Prince George, as part of its 100th anniversary celebrations, hosted the 2015 Canada Winter Games. The Lheidli T'enneh were the Official Host First Nation, the first time the Games acknowledged a First Nations as a formal partner.

Fort George Park renaming
In 2015, Prince George City Council voted in favor of renaming Fort George Park, which is the location of the original HBC post and Lheidli T'enneh village, to Lheidli T'enneh Memorial Park. 

In 2017, 11 human remains were found in an area of the park being developed for a new shelter. The area where remains were found is outside the fence line of the established Cemetery (reserve No.1A), but the fence line of the cemetery is disputed, and remains area likely to be found in a large area around the Cemetery.

Treaty debate

In June 2018, the Lheidli T'enneh First Nation voted against a proposed treaty with the federal and provincial governments, which would have granted self-governance powers.

Pipeline explosion
The Lheidli T'enneh First Nation was affected by an explosion on the Enbridge BC Pipeline in October 2018. The explosion forced about 100 members of the Band to evacuate their homes, even though nobody was hurt in the  explosion, and no property was damaged apart from the pipeline itself.  In 2019, the  First Nation filed a lawsuit seeking a permanent injunction which would prevent Enbridge from operating the pipeline in their territory and reserves, and require the company to dismantle the pipeline and restore the affected lands to their natural state.

Potlatch (Balhats) 
In November 2019, the Lheidli T'enneh hosted their first potlatch (Balhat) in 73 years.

Chief and Council 
Elected for a two-year term on April 09, 2021.

 Chief Dolleen Logan
 Councillor Helen Buzas
 Councillor Crystal Gibbs
 Councillor Marcel Gagnon
 Councillor Joshua Seymour
 Councillor Dominic Frederick

References

BC Treaty Commission news release
Lheidli T'enneh Final Agreement
news article about treaty signing
Treaty 8 Legal challenge Documents
reasons for judgment
Tribal council seeks to delay treaty ratification
PDF - BC Treaty Commission calls For Probe

External links
 Lheidli T'enneh web site
 Lheidli Carrier Dictionary
 Official Lheidli T'enneh Treaty website
 BC Treaty Commission Lheidli T'enneh page
 First Nation Profile - Aboriginal Affairs and Northern Development Canada

Dakelh governments